Scale Hall railway station served the suburb of Scale Hall in Lancaster, Lancashire, England. 

The station was located near Ovangal Road. The station opened in 1957 and closed to passengers in 1966 with the line between Lancaster Green Ayre, and Morecambe Promenade. 

The line has since been converted into a footpath. The station has been demolished. The old line can still be followed on satellite.

References

External links

https://www.pastscape.org.uk/hob.aspxhob_id=498890&sort=2&type=&rational=a&class1=None&period=None&county=1306799&district=None&parish=None&place=&recordsperpage=10&source=text&rtype=&rnumber=&p=144&move=p&nor=6188&recfc=1000 

Railway stations opened by British Rail
Railway stations in Great Britain opened in 1957
Railway stations in Great Britain closed in 1966
Beeching closures in England
Disused railway stations in Lancaster